Pyrovalerone (Centroton, 4-Methyl-β-keto-prolintane, Thymergix, O-2371) is a psychoactive drug with stimulant effects via acting as a norepinephrine-dopamine reuptake inhibitor (NDRI), and is used for the clinical treatment of chronic fatigue or lethargy and as an anorectic or appetite suppressant for weight loss purposes. It was developed in the late 1960s and has since been used in France and several other European countries, and  although pyrovalerone is still occasionally prescribed, it is used infrequently due to problems with abuse and dependence. It is closely related on a structural level to a number of other stimulants, such as α-PVP, MDPV and prolintane (Promotil, Katovit).

Side effects of pyrovalerone include anorexia or loss of appetite, anxiety, fragmented sleep or insomnia, and trembling, shaking, or muscle tremors. Withdrawal following abuse upon discontinuation often results in depression.

The R-enantiomer of pyrovalerone is devoid of activity.

See also 

 4-Et-PVP
 α-Pyrrolidinohexiophenone (α-PHP)
 α-Pyrrolidinopentiothiophenone (α-PVT)
 Methylenedioxypyrovalerone (MDPV)
 Naphyrone (O-2482)
 Prolintane (Promotil, Katovit)
 4'-Methyl-α-pyrrolidinohexiophenone (MPHP, 4-MPHP)

References 

Cathinones
Norepinephrine–dopamine reuptake inhibitors
Pyrrolidinophenones
Substituted amphetamines
4-Tolyl compounds